"You're the Reason I'm Living"" is a 1963 single written and performed by Bobby Darin, from his album of the same name. Musicians on the recording session included drummer Earl Palmer.

Chart performance
The single was very successful spending 2 weeks at #3 on Billboard's Hot 100 singles chart beginning March 16, 1963.  "You're the Reason I'm Living" peaked at #9 on the Hot R&B Singles chart.

Cover versions
Elvis Presley recorded a live version of the song for 1975's "Live in Las Vegas."

References

1963 singles
Bobby Darin songs
Songs written by Bobby Darin
1963 songs
Capitol Records singles